A statue of Christopher Columbus was installed in New Haven, Connecticut, United States.

History
The statue was fabricated from heavy sheet copper by W. H. Mullins of Salem, Ohio in 1892. 
The gift of Italian-Americans, the statue was installed in 1892 in Wooster Square. An October 12, 1892 article in the New Haven Register described the time capsule that was placed under the statue: "The corner stone will hold a metallic box containing a number of coins and papers enclosed in a leathery case. There will be a written account of the proceedings of the day, together with a number of American, Italian, and Spanish coins.”

In 1955, the original copper statue, which had deteriorated over time, was recast in bronze.

Vandalism and removal
In 2017, the statue was vandalized prior to Columbus Day, with red paint splashed on the statue and the words "kill the colonizer" spray-painted along its base. 

The statue was removed on June 24, 2020.

See also

 List of monuments and memorials to Christopher Columbus

References

Buildings and structures in New Haven, Connecticut
Monuments and memorials in Connecticut
Monuments and memorials removed during the George Floyd protests
Sculptures of men in Connecticut
Statues in Connecticut
New Haven, Connecticut
Vandalized works of art in Connecticut
Statues removed in 2020